Fan Kuang-chun (born 16 March 1939) is a Taiwanese lawyer and politician.

Education and legal career
Fan earned an LL.B from National Taiwan University and studied at Columbia University Law School in the United States. He and John Chen co-founded Formosa Transnational Attorneys at Law in 1974. Fan has also worked for the Examination Yuan and served as a judge at the district court level in Taipei and Taichung.

Political career
Fan served as spokesman for a group of cross-strait relations advisers President Chen Shui-bian formed in 2000. On 14 June 2001, Chen started the Hakka Affairs Council, and appointed Fan the first minister. Fan left the Hakka Affairs Council to become governor of Taiwan Province. He joined the Democratic Progressive Party in January 2003. During his governorship, Hualien County Magistrate Chang Fu-hsing died in office, and Premier Yu Shyi-kun named Fan the acting magistrate on 20 May 2003. On 7 October 2003, Fan was selected as the secretary-general of the Judicial Yuan by Chen Shui-bian. That same day, he resigned from the Democratic Progressive Party. In July 2007, media speculation linked Fan to a promotion as vice president of the Judicial Yuan, but he remained secretary-general of the body until at least September of that year.

References

1939 births
Living people
Politicians of the Republic of China on Taiwan from Hsinchu County
20th-century Taiwanese judges
Taiwanese politicians of Hakka descent
Democratic Progressive Party (Taiwan) politicians
Chairpersons of the Taiwan Provincial Government
Columbia Law School alumni
National Taiwan University alumni
Magistrates of Hualien County